Lipar is a village in the Kula municipality, in the West Bačka District, Vojvodina province, Serbia. The village has a Serb ethnic majority and its population numbering  1,482 people (2011 census).

Historical population
1961: 1,890
1971: 1,609
1981: 1,506
1991: 1,456
2002: 1,807
2011:  1,482

External links

Official presentation of the local community Lipar

Places in Bačka
West Bačka District
Kula, Serbia